J. R. Reed may refer to:

J. R. Reed (American football, born 1982), American football safety
J. R. Reed (American football, born 1996), American football safety
JR Reed (actor) (born 1967), American actor and singer
J. R. Reid (born 1968), American basketball player